Briege McKenna (born 1946) is an Irish-American Catholic nun, Christian mystic, and faith healer.

Life
McKenna was born in Newry in Northern Ireland. Her father was a tenant farmer. She joined the Poor Clares convent at age 14. Two years after her religious profession she was sent to Tampa, Florida, as a teacher. She claims she was cured of rheumatoid arthritis at age 24 during the celebration of the Eucharist. McKenna recounts having received the gift of healing in prayer. She is also known as an evangelist.

Ministry of Intercession for Priests 
In 1974, McKenna claimed she received spiritual inspiration to work with priests. She holds retreats and seminars, and has worked with around 1000 priests.

Since 1985, McKenna has been ministering to priests in collaboration with Father Kevin Scallon C.M. She was the global rapporteur for an international retreat for priests at the Vatican. In 1988, she was given Franciscan University's Poverello Award, and in 2009 the Outstanding Leadership Award of the Catholic Leadership Institute.

McKenna is one of the spokespersons of the Marian messages broadcast from Medjugorje, following a faith-healing experience at an international conference in 1981.

Works 
 Miracles Do Happen: The Inspiring True Story Of The World-Famous Healer And The Reality Of Miracles (1992).

References

Irish Christian mystics
20th-century Irish nuns
20th-century Christian mystics
1946 births
People from Newry
20th-century women writers from Northern Ireland
Charismatics
Living people
Poor Clares
Northern Ireland emigrants to the United States
20th-century American Roman Catholic nuns